Amphoterus or Amphoteros may refer to:

Amphoterus (son of Alcmaeon) by Callirrhoe (the daughter of the river god Achelous), and brother of Acarnan
Amphoterus, a Trojan; see List of Trojan War characters
Amphoterus (admiral) of Alexander the Great